The Golden Globe Ambassador, until 2017 Miss Golden Globe or Mr. Golden Globe, is the young person who assists in the annual Golden Globe Awards presentations by handing out trophies to the winners and escorting them off stage.

History
The first Miss Golden Globe was named in 1963. Since 1971, the position has been held by a celebrity's daughter, or occasionally a son, or both. Parents have fiercely competed for their child to take the role, which is awarded by the Hollywood Foreign Press Association's president from among candidates selected by the association's board. Being active on social media is part of the selection criteria.

Several Miss Golden Globes later became noted actors and Golden Globe winners in their own right, including Anne Archer (1971), Melanie Griffith (1975) (and her daughter, Dakota Johnson, in 2006), and  Laura Dern (1982).  Being selected as Miss Golden Globe has helped start a media career for some, such as through obtaining modeling campaigns or photo shootings.

In 2018, the role was renamed from "Miss Golden Globe" to "Golden Globe Ambassador" to make it gender-neutral and more inclusive.

List

External links

References

Golden Globe Awards